Vadim Gennadievich Kazachenko (born 13 July 1963) is a Soviet, Russian, and Ukrainian singer. He had a music career in the 1990s. He was the frontman of the group Freestyle.

Biography 
He was born in Poltava.

In 2011 he received the Merited Artist of the Russian Federation.

He came second in season 2 of One to One! in 2014. In 2023, he was first contestant eliminated in Season 4 of the Russian version of The Masked Singer, as porcupine.

References

External links
 

1963 births
Living people
Soviet pop singers
Honored Artists of the Russian Federation
Russian pop singers
Ukrainian pop singers
Musicians from Poltava